Jisr Al-Shoughour  is a Syrian village located in الحسانية هتيا  in Hassaniyeh - Hatya District, Idlib.  According to the Syria Central Bureau of Statistics (CBS),  had an Hassaniyeh - Hatya District of 681 in the 2004 census.

References 

Populated places in Idlib Governorate